Vertical Worship, previously known as  Vertical Church Band, is a contemporary Christian and worship band from Chicago, Illinois as part of the Harvest Bible Chapel. They are signed to Provident Label Group and have released seven albums through Essential Records: Live Worship from Vertical Church in 2012, Rock Won't Move in 2013, Church Songs on January 16, 2015, Frontiers on July 29, 2016, the self-titled album, Vertical Worship, in 2017, Bright Faith Bold Future on April 6, 2018, and Grace Is On Our Side on March 13, 2020.

Background
The music collective is from Chicago, Illinois, where they form Harvest Bible Chapel, and they started making music in 2012. They have since released multiple worship records. 

The band released Live Worship from Vertical Church on July 31, 2012 on Essential Records and it peaked on Billboards Christian Albums chart at No. 10 and No. 9 on the Heetseekers Albums chart. Vertical EP was released on May 7, 2013. It was followed by The Rock Won't Move on October 29, 2013 and charted at No. 58 on the Billboard 200, No. 2 on the Christian Albums chart. White EP was released on November 4, 2014. Their third album, Church Songs, was released on January 20, 2015 and peaked at No. 31 on the Billboard 200 and topped the Christian Albums chart and was followed by the "Church Songs Tour & Workshop" national tour concluding in June, 2015.

Members 

Current
Jake France – worship leader and electric guitar, 2016-current
Judd Harris – worship leader and acoustic guitar, 2018-current
Robert Titean – electric guitar, 2014-current
James Herlo – bass guitar, 2014-current
Zac Moore – drums, 2018-current
Tim Dalrymple - worship leader and electric guitar, 2021-current
Vanessa Dalrymple - worship leader and acoustic guitar, 2021-current

Former
Lauren Smith – worship leader and acoustic guitar, 2016-2022
Kyle Smith – worship leader, electric guitar, keys, and musical director, 2016-2022
Andi Rozier – worship leader and acoustic guitar, 2012-2021. (now at New Life Church)
Kyle Fredricks – worship leader and acoustic guitar, 2012–2017
Meredith Andrews – worship leader, 2012–2017
Jon Guerra – worship leader and acoustic guitar, 2012-2020
Jacob Sooter – worship leader, acoustic guitar, keys, and musical director, 2012–2017
Seth McConkey – worship leader
Lindsay McCaul – worship leader
Heather Headley – worship leader
Tara Cruz - worship leader, 2012-2021
Kyle Rahtjen - keyboards, bass guitar, 2012-2019

Discography

EPs
Vertical EP (May 7, 2013, Essential Worship)
White EP (November 4, 2014, Essential Worship)
Planetarium EP (August 31, 2018, Essential Worship)
Yes I Will - EP (March 29, 2019, Essential Worship)

Albums

Singles

Awards

GMA Dove Awards

|-
|2019 || "Yes I Will" || Worship Song of the Year || 
|}

Notes

References

External links
 

Essential Records (Christian) artists
Performers of contemporary worship music
Musical groups from Chicago
2012 establishments in Illinois
Musical groups established in 2012